This is the discography of American blues guitarist and singer Buddy Guy.

Solo

Singles & EPs

Albums

Studio albums

Live albums

Compilations

Concert films

Collaborations

Singles & EPs

Albums

Studio albums

Live albums

Concert films

Music videos

Appearances

Singles & EPs

Albums

Studio albums

Live albums

Compilations

Soundtracks

Concert films

Tribute albums

References 

Blues discographies
Discographies of American artists